Dave Zirin, born 1974, is an American political sportswriter. He is the sports editor for The Nation, a weekly progressive magazine dedicated to politics and culture, and writes a blog named Edge of Sports: the weekly sports column by Dave Zirin. As of January 2022, he has authored eleven books.

Early life and education
Zirin was born in New York City. He is of Jewish descent. He graduated from Macalester College in St. Paul, Minnesota.

Career 
Zirin was the host of the Edge of Sports Podcast, hosted by the Slate/Panoply network.  He also co-hosted "The Collision: Where Sports and Politics Collide on Pacifica Radio" with former NBA player Etan Thomas. Zirin is a contributor to The Nation, and has been a columnist for SLAM Magazine, and The Progressive. He has been a guest on ESPN's Outside The Lines and Democracy Now!.

His first book, What’s My Name, Fool? Sports and Resistance in the United States (Haymarket Books) has entered its third printing.

Zirin has published Welcome to the Terrordome: The Pain, Politics, and Promise of Sports, and A People’s History of Sports in the United States, a sports-related volume in the manner of Howard Zinn's A People's History of the United States series for The New Press. In addition to “What’s My Name, Fool?”, he has also published “The Muhammad Ali Handbook” for MQ Publications. Zirin is also the published children’s book author of “My Name is Erica Montoya de la Cruz” (RC Owen).  "A People's History of Sports" forms the basis of a documentary co-written and narrated by Zirin called Not Just A Game: Power, Politics and American Sports, produced by the Media Education Foundation.

Zirin is the co-author with John Carlos of The John Carlos Story: The Sports Moment That Changed the World (Haymarket Books, 2011).

He writes a blog named Edge of Sports: the weekly sports column by Dave Zirin.

Political views 
Zirin has repeatedly called for sports boycotts of certain teams, states, or nations for political reasons.

Call for boycott of Arizona
On April 27, 2010, writing for The Guardian, Zirin called for a boycott against sports teams from Arizona, in particular the Diamondbacks, to protest the Arizona SB 1070, the Support Our Law Enforcement and Safe Neighborhoods Act. He expressed support during the 2010 NBA Playoffs for the Phoenix Suns, who went by "Los Suns" as a statement against the Arizona immigration law.

Support of boycotts of Israel
On June 2, 2010, writing for The Nation, Zirin justified the decision of the Turkish U-19 soccer team to boycott a match against Israel. He described the Gaza flotilla raid as an act of state terror committed by the Israeli government and proposed a boycott of Israel.

Criticism of Hank Williams, Jr.
On October 6, 2011, during a live interview conducted on the sports cable television network, ESPN, Zirin referred to Hank Williams, Jr. as racist and proslavery after Williams, the writer and singer of ESPN's then-Monday Night Football theme song, made a political statement in which he compared multiracial US President Barack Obama to former German national socialist leader, Adolf Hitler.

Defense of Barry Bonds
In an undated interview, Zirin claims “I never wrote that I "believe Bonds has never done steroids."” He continues: “unlike oh so many others, the man never actually failed a steroids test. Is there a ton of circumstantial evidence that the man juiced? Absolutely. But he is still the best player I've ever seen. The best player of what will go down as the anabolic era.” Zirin claims that, rather than steroid use, “much of the reaction to Bonds is simply bad old-fashioned racism”.

Some of his articles and interviews defending Bonds include:
The Juice and the Noose (November/December 2006)
 The Unforgiven: Jack Johnson and Barry Bonds, Edge of Sports (June 19, 2007)
 Barry Bonds: Steroids, Scapegoats and Sweet Satisfaction, Edge of Sports (August 9, 2007)
 Indicted!: Barry Bonds Busted by a Broken System, Edge of Sports (November 15, 2007)
 Bosses’ Boycott: The Bonds Vanishes, Edge of Sports (May 12, 2008)
 No Softballs: Dave Zirin (undated interview)

Bibliography
What's My Name, Fool? Sports and Resistance in the United States, Chicago: Haymarket Books, 2005. |  
Welcome to the Terrordome: The Pain, Politics, and Promise of Sports, Chicago: Haymarket Books, 2007. |  
Muhammad Ali Handbook, Chicago: MB Press, 2007. |  
A People's History of Sports In The United States", The New Press, 2008. |  Bad Sports: How Owners Are Ruining the Games We Love, New York: Scribner Books, 2010. |  The John Carlos Story: The Sports Moment That Changed the World, Chicago: Haymarket Books, 2011. |  Game Over: How Politics Has Turned the Sports World Upside Down, The New Press. 2013. |  Brazil's Dance with the Devil: The World Cup, the Olympics, and the Fight for Democracy, Haymarket Books. 2014. Things That Make White People Uncomfortable Hardcover – Apr 13 2018Jim Brown: Last Man Standing Hardcover – May 15, 2018The Kaepernick Effect: Taking a Knee, Changing the World—September 14, 2021 - Hardcover

Movies in DVD format
 Not Just a Game – Power, Politics & American Sports, Media Education Foundation, 62-minutes, 2011 | 
 Race, Power & American Sports'', Featuring Dave Zirin, Media Education Foundation, 45-minutes, 2013 |

References

External links 

 The Edge of Sports

1974 births
Living people
American columnists
American feminists
20th-century American Jews
Members of the International Socialist Organization
American sportswriters
Male feminists
Socialist feminists
The Nation (U.S. magazine) people
CNN people
Jewish anti-Zionism in the United States
Macalester College alumni
Journalists from New York City
21st-century American Jews